Speed is a 1936 Metro-Goldwyn-Mayer action film directed by Edwin L. Marin. It starred James Stewart, in his first starring role, and Wendy Barrie. Although only a low-budget "B" movie, the film was notable for its realistic cinematography by Lester White, incorporating scenes from the Indianapolis 500 race and on-location shooting at the Muroc dry lake bed, used for high-speed racing by "hot rodders" in the 1930s.

Plot

Auto mechanic Terry Martin, the chief car tester for Emery Motors in Detroit, is working on his own time to perfect a revolutionary design for a new carburetor. Automotive engineer Frank Lawson is a rival for the attention of Jane Mitchell, who has just been hired to work in the publicity department. Terry has little formal education and resents inferences that his knowledge of cars is inferior to that of the trained Lawson. He nearly loses his job when he makes a jealous spectacle of himself at a company dinner dance that Jane attends with Frank.

Working out the bugs of the new carburetor proves to be troublesome for Terry and his fellow in-car riding mechanic "Gadget" Haggerty. Jane, attracted to Terry despite his "inferiority complex", arranges with company vice president Mr. Dean to have the work financed by Emery, on the condition that Frank be added to the team. Their car races in the Indianapolis 500 to test the carburetor despite Terry's hunch that something is still wrong with it. Fighting for the lead, it ends up crashing, injuring Terry and nearly killing Gadget. Terry blames Frank, who insisted the car was ready, until Jane reveals she pulled strings to have Frank included in the project. Thinking that she loves Frank and wanted him to get all the credit for success, Terry angrily sends her away.

While Terry is recovering from his injury, Jane goes to bat for him. Emery's board of trustees have suspended further financing for the carburetor, but Jane gets their decision reversed, since she is secretly Jane Emery, the niece and heiress of the company's owner. In a new car designed to make a world speed record at the Muroc Dry Lake in California, Terry proves that his design works but nearly loses his life in the attempt. When a fuel pipe cracks, choking fumes are funneled into the cockpit causing the record run to end prematurely. Terry is severely injured. With only minutes to save his life, Frank places him in the car and drives it to the Muroc hospital at high speed, completing the world record run in the process. Terry is finally vindicated and wins the girl as well.

Cast
As appearing in screen credits (main roles identified):

Production

Principal photography took place at the MGM studio, its Culver City, California backlot, and on location from March 20 to April 7, 1936. MGM had wanted to develop a film with a speed-racing theme to capitalize on worldwide headlines about Malcolm Campbell breaking the world's speed record for an automobile in his "Blue Bird", on September 3, 1935 at the Bonneville Salt Flats.For the sake of convenience and with a limited budget, Speed instead used the nearby Muroc, California area to recreate the film's record-breaking runs.

Scenes of the actual Indianapolis 500 were used from an earlier era when riding mechanics had to be incorporated in the race cars. The Emery "Falcon" world speed record race car transposed to the similar testing area, the Muroc dry lake bed, resembles the Tatra V570 streamliner series, but was a car designed and built by Harlan Fengler. He built the car to make an attempt at the land speed record but, after investing $100,000, ran out of money. The realistic sequences of an automobile factory that begin the film were shot in advance at Chrysler. The production company was able to film at the Chrysler factory in Detroit, and show the latest model Chrysler Airflow cars produced in the assembly line and the use of the testing grounds.

For Stewart, in his first starring role, he later recalled, "The only way to learn to act is to act ... For instance, I would have a tiny part in a big picture with stars like Clark Gable and Jean Harlow and others, and then I would have a big part in a tiny picture [Speed] and so on." During a hectic period, from 1935 to 1939, Stewart appeared in 29 motion pictures.  The roles spanned a wide gamut of characters, from a mechanic/speed driver as he portrayed in Speed to that of a detective, doctor, executive, farmer, football star, lawyer, newspaperman, rustic "hayseed", soldier/sailor, skater, teacher, and even a murderer.  Stewart considered Speed a good training ground, "I did a picture called 'Speed' which gave me my first leading role ... although it was a low-budget picture ... and Ted Healy, who played my best friend, told me, 'Think of the audience as partners ... as collaborators ... not just watchers. You have to involve them'."

Reception
Critics dismissed the film as passable at best, citing that the plot was weak and moved too slowly, the supporting cast was substandard, and the use of stock footage made it more of a documentary than a drama while at the same time appearing uncredible. Variety wrote that it was, "...too news reely to get more than passing interest" and that while the film offered a new romantic lead, film audiences were not interested in debuts. Howard Barnes of the New York Herald-Tribune called it "a very ordinary Hollywood stencil", while Frank Nugent of The New York Times stated that "Mr. Stewart [and the rest of the cast] perform as pleasantly as possible."

Home media
Rarely broadcast on television, Speed has been released on DVD format with an accompanying "short", The Bottle and the Throttle (1968), a U.S. educational film, on the ramifications of drinking and driving.

References
Notes

Citations

Bibliography

 Dewey, Donald. James Stewart: A Biography. Nashville, Tennessee: Turner Publishing, 1996. .
 Eyles, Allen. James Stewart. New York: Stein & Day, 1986. .
* Jacobs, Timothy. Lemons: The World's Worst Cars. London: The Bison Group, 1991. .
 Jones, Ken D., Arthur F. McClure and Alfred E. Twomey. The Films of James Stewart. New York: Castle Books, 1970.

 Munn, Michael. Jimmy Stewart: The Truth Behind the Legend. London: Robson Books, 2005. .
 Okuda, Ted and Edward Watz. The Columbia Comedy Shorts: Two-Reel Hollywood Film Comedies, 1933-1958. Jefferson, North Carolina: McFarland & Company Inc. Publishers, 1986. .
 Radbruch. Dan. Dirt Track Auto Racing, 1919-1941: A Pictorial History. Jefferson, North Carolina: McFarland & Company Inc., 2004. .

External links

 
 

1936 films
1930s English-language films
American auto racing films
Films directed by Edwin L. Marin
Metro-Goldwyn-Mayer films
American black-and-white films
1930s American films